Jill Susann McDonough is an American poet.

Life 
She grew up in North Carolina.
She graduated from Stanford University and has an MA from Boston University. 
She taught in the Prison Education Program of Boston University.

Her work has appeared in The Threepenny Review, Oxford Magazine, The New Republic, and Slate. She is married to bartender and musician Josey Packard. She has written of her marriage in an essay titled "A Natural History of my Marriage".

Awards
 National Endowment for the Arts fellow
 Fine Arts Work Center fellow
 Dorothy and Lewis B. Cullman Center fellow
 Wallace Stegner Fellow at Stanford University
 2010 Witter Bynner Fellowship
 2014 Lannan Literary Award

Bibliography

Collections

Where you live, London: Salt, 2012, 
Reaper, Farmington, ME: Alice James Books, 2017,

Anthologies

List of poems

References

External links
http://www.poetrymountain.com/authors/jillmcdonough.html
http://www.cortlandreview.com/issue/40/mcdonough.html
 Jill McDonough's poem "Tomorrow Never Dies II" in  Gulf Coast: A Journal of Literature and Fine Arts (25.1).

American women poets
Poets from North Carolina
Stanford University alumni
Boston University alumni
Living people
Boston University faculty
National Endowment for the Arts Fellows
Year of birth missing (living people)
American women academics
21st-century American women
American LGBT poets